Dichotomosiphon is a genus of green algae in the family Dichotomosiphonaceae. This genus is distinguished from all other members of the Bryopsidales by its oogamous reproduction and freshwater habitat. In both vegetative and reproductive aspects, it is remarkably similar to the genus Vaucheria, which is a member of the unrelated class Xanthophyceae.

References

External links

Ulvophyceae genera
Bryopsidales